Waytani (Aymara wayta headdress made of feathers or flowers, -ni, a  suffix to indicate ownership, 'the one with the decoration on the head', Hispanicized spelling Huaytane) is a mountain in the Wansu mountain range in the Andes of Peru, about  high. It is situated in the Apurímac Region, Antabamba Province, Oropesa District, in the Arequipa Region, La Unión Province, Puyca District, and in the Cusco Region, Chumbivilcas Province, Santo Tomás District, south of the mountain Chankuwaña.

See also 
 Chankuwaña
 Wamanmarka

References 

Mountains of Peru
Mountains of Apurímac Region
Mountains of Arequipa Region
Mountains of Cusco Region